Origin of the Storm is the second full-length album by the Melodic metalcore band The Sorrow. It was released on February, 27th, 2009 through Drakkar Records.

Track listing

2009 albums
The Sorrow albums